Corbeşti may refer to several villages in Romania:

 Corbeşti, a village in Petriș Commune, Arad County
 Corbeşti, a village in Ceica Commune, Bihor County
 Corbeşti, a village in Acățari Commune, Mureș County

See also 
 Corb (disambiguation)